Tausa is a municipality and town of Colombia in the Ubaté Province, part of the department of Cundinamarca. Tausa is and was an important town on the Altiplano Cundiboyacense due to its salt mine. It was the third most prolific salt deposit for the original inhabitants of the area; the Muisca. The municipality borders San Cayetano, Carmen de Carupa and Sutatausa in the north, Pacho in the west, Sutatausa, Cucunubá and Suesca in the east and in the south with Nemocón and Cogua.

Etymology 
The name Tausa comes from Chibcha and means "tribute".

History 
Tausa was inhabited since the Herrera Period. The town was an important mining location of halite for the Muisca. The zipa of Bacatá ruled over Tausa. The mining activities can be seen in the seal of the village; the pick and spade.

Modern Tausa was founded on August 2, 1600.

Economy 
Main sources of income of Tausa are agriculture, livestock farming and salt mining.

See also 

 Muisca economy#Mining
 Nemocón
 Zipaquirá

References

Bibliography 
 

Municipalities of Cundinamarca Department
Populated places established in 1600
1600 establishments in the Spanish Empire
Muisca Confederation
Muysccubun